The 2018 Hungarian Grand Prix (formally the Formula 1 Rolex Magyar Nagydíj 2018) was a Formula One motor race held on 29 July 2018 at the Hungaroring in Mogyoród, Hungary.

Mercedes driver Lewis Hamilton entered the round with a 17-point lead over Sebastian Vettel in the Drivers' Championship, and extended it to 24 points. In the World Constructors' Championship, Mercedes led Ferrari by 8 points before the race, and they further extended their lead to 10 points.

Report

Background 
The Ferrari crew wore black armbands in honour of former Ferrari chairman Sergio Marchionne, who died following complications from surgery on 25 July 2018. Black stripes were also incorporated into the cars of Ferrari as well as engine customer teams Haas and Sauber in tribute to Marchionne.

Race
Hamilton led away from pole and got away well with Bottas in close pursuit. Max Verstappen retired on lap 5 following an engine failure, with a brief virtual safety car period to remove his car. Hamilton pitted from the lead on lap 25, Vettel stayed out and didn't make his pit stop until lap 39, and was unable to get out ahead of Bottas. By lap 65, Vettel and Räikkönen had caught up to Bottas on fresher tyres. Vettel went for an overtake at turn 2 and moved into second place, Bottas made contact trying to defend, damaging his front wing and letting Räikkönen through. Three laps later, Daniel Ricciardo attempted an overtake on Bottas, the two drivers also made contact and picked up damage. Bottas gave the position up on the final lap, finishing in fifth. He was later handed a 10-second time penalty for causing a collision, this did not change his finishing position. Hamilton won the race, seventeen seconds ahead of Vettel, with Räikkönen finishing in third.

Post-race 
Mercedes team principal Toto Wolff praised Bottas for holding off the Ferraris that resulted in a large finishing gap to Hamilton, calling him a "sensational wingman". Bottas reacted by saying that being called a wingman "hurts", and that he could have finished better if not for his tyre wear, and that he would speak to team management to discuss the issue. Wolff later clarified his remarks, stating that there is no number one or number two driver, and that Bottas drove a sensational race to help Hamilton.

Classification

Qualifying 

Notes
  – Lance Stroll was required to start from the pit lane after changing his front wing.

Race 

Notes
  – Valtteri Bottas received a 10-second time penalty for causing a collision with Daniel Ricciardo.

Championship standings after the race

Drivers' Championship standings

Constructors' Championship standings

 Note: Only the top five positions are included for both sets of standings.

See also
 2018 Budapest Formula 2 round
 2018 Budapest GP3 Series round

References

External links

Hungarian
Grand Prix
Hungarian Grand Prix
Hungarian Grand Prix